Six Cross Roads was an old village in the Parish of Saint Philip in Barbados.

Today, the village has been sectioned off and sold for retail and housing purposes. The reason this village was referred to as such is because of the unique six roads it has extending from a central roundabout. Barbados' Highway 5 extends into the area. It is very busy but not too populated. You can find a post office, Knignt's Pharmacy store and Emerald City Supermarket plus Shell, BNB (Barbados national bank), Chickmont foods store and a Chefette. Emerald city is a huge supermarket; food, drugs, cleaning objects, clothes store and more can be bought there. Knight's Pharmacy is a pharmacy found everywhere in Barbados and other islands; some of these pharmacies are convenience stores. The Sunbury Plantation House & Museum is located in Six Cross Roads.

References

Populated places in Barbados